Chhatrapal Singh Lodha is an Indian politician of the Bharatiya Janata Party elected as Rajya Sabha MP from Orissa. He has also served 4 times as Lok Sabha MP of Bulandshahr from 1991 to 2004.

He was one of the accused in the 2005 cash-for-question scandal. In a sting operation named Operation Duryodhana the media firm Cobrapost caught him on camera accepting a bribe of 15,000 rupees (about US$350) for asking concocted questions in Parliament.

Chairperson of the Rajya Sabha Bhairon Singh Shekhawat asked the Ethics Committee to probe the allegations against Chhatrapal and within 48 hours the panel found reason for his suspension. As a result, he was expelled from the Rajya Sabha.

His name also figured in the Operation Chakravyuha which accused seven members of parliament including Chhatrapal of seeking kickbacks for getting projects sanctioned under the Members of Parliament Local Area Development Scheme (MPLADS).

References

Living people
Bharatiya Janata Party politicians from Uttar Pradesh
Rajya Sabha members from Odisha
1946 births